Leslie Wilkinson , FRAIA,  (12 October 1882 – 20 September 1973) was a UK-born Australian architect and academic. He was the founding dean of the faculty of architecture at University of Sydney in 1920. A traditionalist, he is known for his residential and church architecture.

Early life and education
Leslie Wilkinson was born on 12 October 1882 at New Southgate, Middlesex, England, the younger son of commercial clerk Edward Henry Wilkinson.

In his early years, he studied at St Edward's School, Oxford and at the Royal Academy of Arts, London, winning several awards, including the touring scholarship (1904,1905) that allowed him to travel to France, Italy, Spain and England. It was in these early years that his love of Mediterranean and Italian Renaissance architecture developed. In 1903, Wilkinson had become assistant to noted architect James S. Gibson, while also studying and entering competitions.

Career 
Wilkinson was an associate of the Royal Institute of British Architects in 1907. In 1908, he became Professor F. M. Simpson's assistant at University College in London and later became assistant professor. He enlisted in the Territorial Force during World War I.

In 1918, he was appointed to the new chair of architecture (within the faculty of science) at the University of Sydney. Arriving later that year, he threw his energy into the creation of a faculty of architecture; succeeding in 1920, he became the first dean.

Throughout his time in Australia, Wilkinson also continued to practise as an architect. He was appointed architect for the University of Sydney in 1919, where he contributed to the university's master plan (inspired by the Walter Burley Griffin's previous unused 1915 campus masterplan), as well as a number of building projects. He also designed over 30 commissions for houses and flats, and some church designs.

In 1933, he became president of the newly formed New South Wales state chapter of the Royal Australian Institute of Architects (RAIA), and in 1937 was a founding member of Robert Menzies' anti-modernist Australian Academy of Artists.

Awards and recognition 

 Royal Academy of Art Silver Medal, 1903
 Royal Academy of Art Gold Medal, 1905
 Sir John Sulman Medal, 1934 and 1942
 Royal Australian Institute of Architects inaugural Gold Medal, 1961 (now known as Wilkinson Awards)
 Honorary Award, University of Sydney, 1970

The Wilkinson Building, which houses the University of Sydney School of Architecture, Design and Planning, was named in his honour.

Death and legacy
Wilkinson died on 20 September 1973 in the Sydney suburb of Vaucluse.

His ideals on architecture as a form of art had strongly influenced both the school and its students. The emphasis on the teaching of philosophy and practice of design was at the time a frontier in architecture education. Wilkinson was never a part of the modern architecture movement. His work, both as a teacher and practising architect, was consistently involved only with traditional architecture, which was inspired by Australian's colonial heritage and Mediterranean architecture. This reflected his training at the Royal Academy of Arts and his study tours in France, Italy, Spain and Great Britain. Wilkinson's influential work is seen in residential and church architecture, and the University of Sydney master plan.

Notable projects

Academic 

 Completion of Edmund Blacket's Gothic Revival Quadrangle, University of Sydney, 1919
 Chemistry Building, University of Sydney, 1923
 Physics Building, University of Sydney, 1926

Residential 
 Wilkinson Residence, Greenway, 1923
 Verona Residence, Double Bay, 1923
 Silchester, Bellevue Hill, 1930
 Greyleaves, Burradoo, 1934
 Samuel Hordern's Residence, Bellevue Hill, 1936
 Maiala, Warrawee, 1937
 Hazeldean, Cooma, 1937
 Markdale Homestead, Crookwell, 1951

Ecclesiastical 
 St John's Church of England (now Anglican), Penshurst, Sydney 
 St John's Church of England (now Anglican), Maroubra, Sydney
 St Paul's Church, Harris Park, Sydney
 Completion of Blacket's St Michael's Anglican Church, 
 Original design of Ss Peter and Paul Cathedral, Dogura, Papua New Guinea, 1932, which was much modified by a local lay worker, Robert Jones

References

External links 
 Honorary Award, University of Sydney, Leslie Wilkinson
 Drawings and Photographs by Leslie Wilkinson, Library of NSW
 

1882 births
1973 deaths
Australian Officers of the Order of the British Empire
Royal Institute of British Architects
Recipients of the Royal Australian Institute of Architects’ Gold Medal
University of Sydney people
New South Wales architects
Associates of the Royal Institute of British Architects